Graysville is an unincorporated community in Turman Township, Sullivan County, in the U.S. state of Indiana.

The community is part of the Terre Haute Metropolitan Statistical Area.

History
Graysville was named after its founder, Joe Gray. The post office at Graysville has been in operation since 1849.

Geography

References

Unincorporated communities in Sullivan County, Indiana
Unincorporated communities in Indiana
Terre Haute metropolitan area